Magic Mountain is a ski resort located on Glebe Mountain in Londonderry, Vermont.  It features a 1,500-foot vertical drop.  The summit is at 2,850 feet and the base at 1,350 feet.

Magic has a long history, dating from the 1960s when ski instructor and film-maker Hans Thorner founded the area as its terrain reminded him of his native Swiss Alps. Part of Vermont's original "Golden Triangle" of ski areas all within 10 miles of each other (Stratton Mountain Resort and Bromley Mountain the other two large areas), Magic thrived in the 1960s, 1970s, and early 1980s.

Eventually, Magic was purchased by Boston Concessions, which also owned Bromley in the mid-1980s. After a downturn in the real-estate market starting in the late 1980s, Bromley decided to close Magic in 1991. The multi-year closure in the 1990s ended in 1997 and Magic reopened to the public and regained a small, but passionate following among ski enthusiasts because of its classic, challenging terrain.

However, the ski area also struggled through multiple owners, operators, and aging infrastructure during the 2000s, even as it continued to slowly expand its customer base. With limited capital reserves and in danger of not opening in 2015 and 2016, the ownership group decided to look for a buyer.

A group led by a local Magic skier then raised enough capital to purchase the property and invest over $2 million in significant snowmaking, lift, bar, and lodge improvements. This group, SKI MAGIC LLC, successfully closed on the purchase of Magic in November 2016 and reopened the ski area in late December. SKI MAGIC continues to operate Magic and invest in these critical infrastructure enhancements to improve and sustain the ski area.

History

In 1960, Hans Thorner opened Magic with a T-Bar on the lower half of Magic, followed by a 5,000-foot double chair in 1962. The 5400' "Red Chair" double was added in 1971 while trail expansion continued and snow-making was added.

In 1985, Magic Mountain was purchased by Bromley owernship (Boston Concessions) and dramatically increased its skiable terrain, by purchasing and connecting the former Timber Ridge Ski Area.  Located on the eastern slope of Glebe Mountain, that area became known as Timber Ridge at Magic.

In 1987, Magic Mountain added a new mid-mountain Poma triple chairlift, serving novice and intermediate terrain.

In 1991, Bromley closed Magic Mountain and Timber Ridge after poor ski seasons and real-estate downturn.  With the exception of the summit Heron-Poma double chairlift (Red) and the Pohlig-Yan triple chairlift (Black), all lifts were removed during liquidation. 

In 1997, Magic was re-opened by private investors led by a dentist from New Jersey. Magic Mountain Management LLC became the property owner by 2001 led by John Nelson, Rob Lyszczarz and Tom Barker.

In 2003, construction was started on a proposed Borvig double chairlift (from Stratton) that would follow the same line as the former Poma triple chairlift.  SKI MAGIC LLC completed the installation of this lift in December 2018.

In 2009, Jim Sullivan, Magic Mountain's operator/manager from 2006-2014 (operating lease from Magic Mountain Management LLC) announced he was looking into a cooperative ownership structure to ensure the future operation, maintenance, and development of the ski area. While some money was raised, ultimately this plan did not work out, and Magic Mountain Management LLC decided to end the Sullivan operating lease in 2014 and transferred the lease to its own Tom Barker under his new company Magic Mountain Resorts, LLC. Barker operated the ski area for the 2014/15 and 2015/16 ski seasons. 

In November 2016, after a poor winter and operating results, Magic Mountain Management LLC sold the ski area property to SKI MAGIC LLC, led by Geoff Hatheway.

In August 2017, SKI MAGIC LLC obtained a Vermont ACT 250 permit for upgrades to snow-making, lifts and lodge. A new magic carpet style lift and beginner/learn-to-ski area, new snow-making pipe, new mid-mountain double chair, and expanded snowmaking pond are key projects in the works for the 2017/18 and 2018/19 seasons. A new-to-Magic fixed-grip Poma Quad (from Stratton) will be ready for the 2019/20 season replacing the old Black Triple Chair lift, significantly expanding Magic's uphill capacity.

The mountain 
The mountain, although not as high as its neighbor's 2,850', has comparable vertical feet of skiing (1,500'), and it can boast of steeper trails (up to 45° at the top of Master Magician). It also has the most extensive tree-skiing/glade network in southern Vermont.

Trails

(g) – gladed trail with trees

Lifts

Past Lifts

References

External links
  Magic Mountain Ski Area - Official site
  Inn at Magic Mountain
  Hostel at Magic Mountain
 skiengine.com review

Ski areas and resorts in Vermont
Buildings and structures in Londonderry, Vermont
Tourist attractions in Windham County, Vermont